Leucophaeus is a small genus of medium-sized New World gulls, most of which are dark in plumage, usually with white crescents above and below the eyes. They were placed in the genus Larus until recently. The genus name Leucophaeus is from Ancient Greek leukos, "white", and phaios, "dusky".

Species

References

 
Bird genera
Taxa named by Carl Friedrich Bruch
Taxonomy articles created by Polbot